The Hallett Flats–Rawson & Co. Apartment Building at 1301–1307 Locust St. in Des Moines, Iowa is a pair of abutting buildings. The Hallett Flats building, at 1305–1307 Locust St., is a three-story building designed by architect George E. Hallett and was built in 1904.  It has also been known as Hallett Apartments.  The Rawson & Co. Apartment Building, a four-story building designed by Proudfoot, Bird and Rawson, was built in 1915 in such a way that the two would function as one building.  It has also been known as Arlington Apartments.  The combination was listed on the National Register of Historic Places in 2000.  The listing included two contributing buildings and one other contributing structure.

It was deemed architecturally significant "as a fine example of a multiple-function complex, designed during the early Twentieth Century by two of Des Moines' most prominent architectural firms."

References

Residential buildings on the National Register of Historic Places in Iowa
Colonial Revival architecture in Iowa
Chicago school architecture in Iowa
Residential buildings completed in 1904
Buildings and structures in Des Moines, Iowa
National Register of Historic Places in Des Moines, Iowa